James Bennison (16 February 1854 – 14 November 1916) was an Australian cricketer. He played one first-class match for Tasmania in 1877.

See also
 List of Tasmanian representative cricketers

References

External links
 

1854 births
1916 deaths
Australian cricketers
Tasmania cricketers
Cricketers from Hobart